Clark Joseph Kent (né Kal-El), best known by his superhero persona Superman, is a superhero in the DC Extended Universe series of films, based on the DC Comics character of the same name created by Jerry Siegel and Joe Shuster. In the films, he is a refugee from the planet Krypton who lands on Earth and develops superhuman abilities. A lengthy conflict with a faction of surviving Kryptonians led by General Zod results in extensive damage to Metropolis, creates a moral divide amongst humanity, and draws the attention of Bruce Wayne / Batman, who would confront Kent for his actions. The two would eventually reconcile their differences to prevent  Doomsday, with the latter giving his life to kill the creature with the assistance of Wayne. Kent eventually gets resurrected and allies himself with the Justice League to  prevent the Unity of the three Mother Boxes and the stop conquest of Earth under Darkseid.

First appearing as the main protagonist of the film Man of Steel (2013), the character is portrayed by Henry Cavill, who is the first non-American actor to portray Superman in film. This version of Superman has also appeared in Batman v Superman: Dawn of Justice (2016), Justice League (2017) (and its 2021 director's cut), and an uncredited cameo appearance in Black Adam (2022), serving as one of the central characters in the DC Extended Universe. Cavill was slated to reprise the character in future projects as of November 2022, including a planned sequel to Man of Steel, with Cavill initially confirming his involvement before announcing weeks later that those plans had been abandoned by new management at DC Studios under James Gunn.

Director Zack Snyder's films in the DCEU have aimed to portray Superman in a more flawed and human light as compared to the previous film series by Warner Bros., which has received polarized reviews from critics.

Character concept and development 
As one of the most prominent superheroes for DC Comics, Superman had previously been portrayed in film several times in film serials and most prominently in the 1978–1987 Superman film series, with Christopher Reeve taking on the role of Superman. While Reeve's performance was widely regarded as one of the greatest in film history, the series was placed in jeopardy following the critical and commercial failure of Superman IV: The Quest for Peace. Following Superman Returns, a 2006 homage sequel to the film series' first two films which saw Brandon Routh replace Reeve, talks commenced regarding using that film to create a shared universe for other DC characters, but they stalled out. With Routh's contract to portray Superman expiring in 2009, Warner Bros. decided to reboot the franchise, beginning to take pitches on ideas to restart the film series. One of the most prominent ideas that emerged was that of a Golden-Age inspired Superman "when he was a bit more of a regular person."

During the production of the Dark Knight trilogy of Batman films, which later saw tremendous success, producer David S. Goyer told director Christopher Nolan his idea regarding how to present Superman in a modern context. Impressed with Goyer's concept, Nolan pitched the idea to the studio, who hired Nolan to produce and Goyer to write based on the financial and critical success of The Dark Knight.

Nolan admired Bryan Singer's work on Superman Returns for its connection to Richard Donner's version, stating that "A lot of people have approached Superman in a lot of different ways. I only know the way that has worked for us that's what I know how to do," emphasizing the idea that Batman exists in a world where he is the only superhero and a similar approach to the Man of Steel would assure the integrity needed for the film. "Each serves to the internal logic of the story. They have nothing to do with each other." Nolan, however, clarified that the new film would not have any relationship with the previous film series. Filming of Man of Steel began in 2011 with a lawsuit stipulating that Warner Bros. would be able to be sued by the family of Superman creator Jerry Siegel for lost revenue on an unproduced film after that year, thanks to the Siegel estate recapturing 50% of the rights to Superman's origins and Siegel's share of the copyright in Action Comics #1, despite the studio not owing the Siegel estate money for previous films.

Casting and execution 

English actor Henry Cavill was cast as Clark Kent/Superman for Man of Steel. Cavill is the first non-American actor to play the character. He was previously cast in Superman: Flyby, which was ultimately shelved, and was considered for the role in Superman Returns, but lost to Routh. Cavill stated, "There's a very real story behind the Superman character." He explained that everyone's goal has been to explore the difficulties his character faces as a result of having multiple identities—including his birth name, Kal-El, and his alter ego, Clark Kent. Cavill also stated that, "He's alone and there's no one like him," referring to Superman's vulnerabilities. "That must be incredibly scary and lonely, not to know who you are or what you are, and trying to find out what makes sense. Where's your baseline? What do you draw from? Where do you draw a limit with the power you have? In itself, that's an incredible weakness." In an interview with Total Film magazine, Cavill stated he had been consuming nearly 5,000 calories a day, training for over two hours daily and plowing protein to pack on the muscle mass. Cooper Timberline was cast as the 9-year-old Clark Kent, and Dylan Sprayberry was cast as the 13-year-old Clark Kent.

During the reshoots of Justice League, Cavill had grown a mustache during lapses in the film's production due to his role in Mission: Impossible – Fallout, and was contractually required by Paramount Pictures to keep the mustache. This conflicted with the reshoots of Justice League, so Cavill's mustache was digitally removed in that film.

While Superman has a cameo appearance in Shazam!, he is portrayed by Zachary Levi's body double due to Cavill being unavailable for filming at the time. At the time, it was unconfirmed whether Cavill would reprise the role again, though he stated in 2021 that he was still open to portraying the character, specifically that "There is still a lot of storytelling for me to do as a Superman, and I would absolutely love the opportunity."

Superman made another cameo appearance in the season finale of the television series Peacemaker, portrayed by actor Brad Abramenko. Abramenko used the same suit Cavill used in the previous films. Later that year, Cavill returned to play the character, making an uncredited cameo appearance during the mid-credits scene of the film Black Adam. Speaking on the appearance of Cavill in the film, which was the first time he shot new material for the character in five years, lead star Dwayne Johnson commented that he, production company Seven Bucks Productions, and producers Dany & Hiram Garcia were instrumental in the re-negotiations between Warner Bros. and Cavill. Cavill later confirmed following the film's release that he was back as the character long-term, and that his appearance in Black Adam was "a very small taste of things to come". However, plans for further appearances from the actor were shafted in later that month upon the newly-christened DC Studios' change in leadership under new heads James Gunn and Peter Safran. The former was in the process of writing a reboot film titled Superman: Legacy (2025) by December, focusing on a younger version of the character that would not be played by Cavill. The film is intended to launch the new DC Universe (DCU) media franchise and shared universe.

Suit design 
Superman's bodysuit in Man of Steel, in addition to that of other Kryptonians such as Jor-El and General Zod, was designed with a textured chain mail motif, which costume designer Michael Wilkinson intended to evoke the "Man of Steel" mantra and other-worldly theme and make Superman stand out from the people of Earth, a departure from previous fabric-based interpretations of the suit. Also notably missing are the red trunks, which Zack Snyder mentioned did not fit in with the world he was building in the film, though the cape was retained to keep Superman recognizable. This also mirrors Superman's redesign in The New 52.

For Batman v Superman: Dawn of Justice, Wilkinson and the costume team continued to streamline Superman's suit, adding new features. Specifically, the crest and biceps of the updated suit incorporate a quote from Joseph Campbell written in the Kryptonian language developed for the films: "Where we had thought to stand alone, we will be with all the world". Wilkinson notes that Snyder is an ardent admirer of Campbell's work, saying that Snyder "found a quote that seemed to really connect with Superman and his place in the world. It was a quote that has to do with the idea of alienation or coming together and feel[ing] a part of society. That’s something that Superman is sort of battling all the time — feelings of alienation and connection. The quote deals with those issues."

For the theatrical release of Justice League, Snyder had originally planned for Superman to wear his black suit, as depicted in the comics storyline The Death of Superman, prior to stepping down, but was overruled by Warner Bros. executives. In the 2021 director's cut of the film, which features Snyder's original footage prior to reshoots in addition to extra footage shot in 2020, Superman's suit has been digitally recolored in scenes that depict him in the black suit.

Themes and characterization 

Like Christopher Reeve's portrayal of the character, the DCEU version of Superman has seen several allusions to Jesus. Many reviewers interpreted Man of Steel as a religious allegory, especially since Warner Bros. set up a website www.manofsteelresources.com that contains "a nine-page pamphlet entitled Jesus – The Original Superhero". Justin Craig of Fox News points out several allegories in Man of Steel to Christ, which include Clark's age of 33 in the film, which was the age of Jesus during his crucifixion, being shackled prior to interrogation similar to Jesus' arrest, and Clark's Earthly father Jonathan being a tradesman similar to Jesus' Earthly father Joseph. Craig also compares Kal-El's struggle to the passion of Christ, stating that "Kal-El is more than willing to sacrifice himself to save the people of Earth. Originally reluctant to reveal his identity and powers to the world, Clark decides to turn himself over to Zod to save humanity from annihilation." Craig further states there is an allegory to the Trinity within Man of Steel: "Jor-El returns to Kal-El on Earth as a ghost, guiding his budding superhero son on his path to salvation. Before Jor-El sends his son off to Earth baby Moses-style, he tells his wife that, like Jesus, 'He'll be a god to them.'" Time magazine's Richard Corliss also provided other allegories, such as comparing Clark's rescue of his classmates at age 12 to Jesus being in the temple at the same age as flashes of their potential, being sent to Earth by a "heavenly father", Jor-El, and Clark visiting a church while contemplating surrendering himself to General Zod to protect mankind, with a mural of Jesus during his final days in the background.

However, Clark struggles with his identity in the DCEU despite being treated as a god by Earth's citizens. Corliss compares Clark in Man of Steel to Jesus as portrayed in The Last Temptation of Christ in that both figures doubt their divinity in their respective films. In addition, film critic Matt Zoller Seitz notes that Cavill and Sprayberry portray a Clark Kent/Superman riddled with conflict on how to display his powers without being labeled a "freak" and dealing with the aftermath of traumatic events from his life, but is forced out of his comfort zone with the arrival of General Zod on Earth. Zoller Seitz also comments that Cavill does not showcase Superman's signature confidence as Christopher Reeve did due to the character's internal conflict in the film. By the time of Batman v. Superman, Clark has settled into his role as a superhero, with Cavill adding "He's more used to this gig, doing his best to save as many lives as he can", further explaining, "He is no longer frantic. He's no longer a wet-behind-the-ears kind of superhero." On the contrary, Superman is forced to deal with heavy criticism of some of his prior actions. He also disagrees with Batman's form of justice in the film, leading to conflict between the two vigilantes.

Despite Superman being described as "joyless" in the first two films of the DCEU, director Zack Snyder mentioned that in his original vision for the character's arc, that Clark would become the "true Superman" by the end of Justice League. Snyder enjoyed working with the idea of Superman grappling with his morality, relationship with Lois Lane, and his place on Earth, in that it would make the character more relatable to mankind, and that Superman would have to "earn" his spot at the "pinnacle of the DC superhero world." However, numerous scenes that would have fleshed out the character's arc in the film's theatrical release were cut out once Joss Whedon took over for Snyder. These deleted scenes were restored in Zack Snyder's Justice League, a director's cut of the film.

Fictional character biography

Arriving on Earth 

In 1980, Kal-El is the first Kryptonian born by natural means in many generations. His parents, Jor-El and Lara-El unsuccessfully fight to save their planet Krypton from inevitable destruction due to the Kryptonians' reckless usage of the planet's resources and must also defend against a plot by General Zod. With no means to save the planet, Jor-El and Lara infuse Kal with a codex containing the genetic information for future Kryptonian births, before sending him to Earth on a pre-programmed starship. They deduce that their son will develop great powers on Earth and will "become a god to them." Kal is discovered by Jonathan and Martha Kent in Smallville, Kansas upon crash-landing on Earth and subsequently raised as their adoptive son, Clark Kent.

As a child, Clark becomes isolated as a result of developing superhuman powers which he tries to hide from others, but one incident sees him single-handedly lift a school bus carrying his classmates from sinking into a river. He learns his true origins from Jonathan, who urges him to keep his powers hidden. In 1997, Jonathan dies in a tornado while refusing to let Clark rescue him, as that might reveal Clark to the world before he's ready. Burdened with guilt and looking for a new purpose in his life, Clark leaves to travel the world for several years under various aliases.

Becoming Superman 

In 2013, Kent ventures to Canada, first getting a job as a bartender but later finding work with a drilling company that has discovered an object that turns out to be a Kryptonian scout ship. Kent enters the ship and activates its central computer using a key left by Jor-El, which allows him to communicate with an artificial intelligence modeled after his father. While following Kent, reporter Lois Lane from the Daily Planet inadvertently triggers the ship's security system. Kent uses his powers to rescue Lane, who is covering the event, before wearing the uniform and testing his flying abilities. Unable to convince supervisor Perry White to publish an article on the incident, Lane tracks down Kent back to his family home in Kansas, intent on finding the truth. She tries to persuade Kent to let her reveal his story, but decides to drop it after hearing of Jonathan's sacrifice, and keeps Kent's identity safe.

When Zod and his followers arrive on Earth and demand Kal-El be turned over, Kent seeks counsel from a local pastor on whether to trust humanity, having confessed that he is the one Zod is looking for and deduced that Zod will wage war regardless, with the pastor telling him to take a "leap of faith". Without revealing his identity and wearing the Kryptonian uniform, Kent meets with the United States Air Force and agrees to comply, with Lane joining him as a hostage. Using the Jor-El AI to take over the ship, Kent and Lane flee and warn the U.S. military of Zod's plan, resulting in an explosive confrontation between Kent and Zod's troops around Smallville, just as Zod orders an invasion. Zod deploys the World Engine from the Kryptonian ship, which touches down in the Indian Ocean and begins firing a beam through the planet towards the ship, severely damaging the city of Metropolis on the opposite side of the world, and initiating the terraforming strategy.

Kent destroys the World Engine while the military launches a suicide attack on the ship, sending Zod's troops back to the Phantom Zone. With the ship destroyed and Krypton's only hope of revival gone, Zod vows to destroy the Earth and its inhabitants out of revenge. The two Kryptonians engage in a lengthy battle across Metropolis, which concludes when Kent is forced to kill Zod as he attacks a cornered family in a train station. In the aftermath, Kent adopts a separate public identity with the military codename Superman and persuades General Calvin Swanwick to let him act independently, so long as he does not turn against humanity. To allow access to dangerous situations without attracting attention, he covertly maintains his civilian identity and takes a job as a freelance reporter for the Daily Planet.

Controversial figure 

In 2015, Superman is now a controversial figure, being hailed as a hero by some, but denounced as a "false god" and dangerous by others, including Wayne Enterprises CEO Bruce Wayne. Kent is now in a relationship with Lane and has received a promotion at the Daily Planet, while as Superman, he has engaged in numerous acts such as engaging wildfires, floods, earthquakes, and other natural disasters, rescuing passengers on a train, halting a missile attack on the United States, and apprehending criminals.

Kent is assigned a sports story in Gotham City by White, but instead starts investigating on Batman. Kent is invited to a gala by Lex Luthor who requests that Kent be the reporter to cover the event. There, he meets Wayne, asking him about his opinion on Batman much to Wayne's annoyance, leading to an argument about the deeds of Superman compared with Batman's, before Luthor injects himself into the conversation to introduce himself. Wayne is at the gala to try and steal information from Luthor, and is also seeking kryptonite in an attempt to take on Superman.  While watching television, Kent sees numerous personalities, including cosmologist Neil DeGrasse Tyson and U.S. Senator June Finch argue about Superman's effect on the world, with Tyson supporting Superman and Finch expressing skepticism. Following White's rebuff of Kent's attempts to investigate Batman and reports of misconduct by Batman from the Gotham Free Press, he decides to confront the caped crusader more directly as Superman, halting Batman's attempt to seize kryptonite from Luthor's men and leaving him a warning.

During a publicized congressional hearing at the U.S. Capitol on Superman's actions, Finch questions Superman for some of his alleged controversies, but a bomb planted there by Luthor explodes, killing everyone inside except for Superman. Superman blames himself for not detecting it in time and self-imposes exile. Luthor lures Superman out of exile by kidnapping Lane and Martha Kent. He pushes Lane off the LexCorp building. Superman saves her and confronts Luthor, who reveals he manipulated him and Batman by fueling their distrust. Luthor demands he kill Batman in exchange for Martha's life. Superman tries to explain this to Batman, who instead attacks him and eventually subdues him using a kryptonite gas following a lengthy duel. As Batman prepares to move in for the kill using the spear, Superman pleads with him to "save Martha," causing Batman to pause in confusion.

Coming to his senses about how far he has fallen from grace after Lois arrives and explains Superman's words, Batman promises to rescue Martha. Superman regains his strength and confronts Luthor on the scout ship. Luthor executes his backup plan, unleashing Doomsday, a genetically engineered monster from Zod's DNA and his own. Diana Prince, an antiques dealer whom Bruce encountered at the gala earlier and was also revealed as a metahuman known as Wonder Woman, arrives with her metahuman powers on display, and joins forces with Batman and Superman against the creature. Though outmatched, Superman realizes its vulnerability to kryptonite and retrieves the spear. After bidding goodbye to Lois, he impales the creature with the spear, but in its dying moments, the creature kills Superman, who was weakened by kryptonite exposure. Superman is mourned by the world, and Clark is given a private funeral in Smallville attended by Lois, Martha, Bruce, Diana, and other close acquaintances.

Resurrection

Theatrical cut 

In 2017, in wake of an invasion by the demonic New God Steppenwolf, Prince teams up with Wayne to create their own metahuman group, recruiting Barry Allen, Arthur Curry / Aquaman, and Victor Stone. However, the group still proves no match for Steppenwolf and his minions, and Wayne comes to the conclusion that they need to resurrect Superman if they truly wish to save the Earth. Kent's body is exhumed by Allen and Stone and placed in the amniotic fluid of the Kryptonian scout ship's genesis chamber, alongside a Mother Box that they had retrieved, as the device was used to save Stone's life after a horrific accident.

Allen uses his powers to charge it up and successfully resurrects Superman. However, Superman's memories have not returned, and he attacks the group after Cyborg accidentally launches a projectile at him. On the verge of being killed by Superman, Batman sends Lane to calm down Superman.

Without Superman to aid them, the five heroes travel to a village in Russia where Steppenwolf aims to unite the Mother Boxes once again to remake Earth for his nephew and superior Darkseid who is the ruler of the planet Apokolips. Superman arrives, remembering his promise to help Batman after Lane reminds him, and assists Allen in evacuating the city, as well as Stone, in separating the Mother Boxes. The team defeats Steppenwolf with Superman and Wonder Woman destroying his axe. Overcome with fear, Steppenwolf is attacked by his own Parademons before they all teleport back to Apokolips.

In the aftermath of the battle, Wayne re-acquires the Kent farm for Martha before it can be foreclosed and decides to rebuild Wayne Manor as a base of operations for the team and he and Prince agree that more heroes could join. Superman resumes his life as Kent and as protector of Earth, thanking Wayne and Prince for not losing hope in humanity, as Batman offers Superman the mantle of leadership for the newly-minted Justice League. Later, Superman later has a friendly race with Flash to see who is faster.

Director's cut 

Superman's scream during his death awakens all three of the Mother Boxes, with the one under watch by the Amazons calling out to alien conqueror Steppenwolf. After Victor explains the nature of the Mother Boxes to the team, indicating that they are unbiased "change machines" and that the boxes did not call out to Steppenwolf until after Superman's death, the team unanimously votes to use the box to resurrect the Man of Steel.

Allen uses his powers to charge up the Box to resurrect Superman successfully. However, Superman's memories have not returned, and he attacks the group after Cyborg's defense system forces him to launch a projectile. After disabling the group one by one, he corners Batman. On the verge of killing him, Superman only stops upon seeing Lois Lane, who arrived on her own after seeing his resurrection.

When Kent leaves with Lane to Smallville to regain his memories, they confirm their engagement after Kent sees her still wearing the ring given to her, and they also reunite with Martha. He voluntarily leaves to fight Steppenwolf, saying the team "brought him back for a reason". Superman picks out a black-colored version of his skinsuit from the scout ship and gets the Justice League's whereabouts from Bruce's butler Alfred Pennyworth, then intercepts a killing blow from Steppenwolf meant for Stone, proceeding to freeze the New God's axe and brutally overpower him, burning off his right horn with his heat vision.

Despite Superman's arrival, Stone cannot pull apart the Mother Boxes in time, leading to an explosion that begins destroying the Earth until Allen enters the speed force, reversing time. Superman then assists Stone in separating the boxes. Aquaman stabs a distracted Steppenwolf from behind and Superman punches him into the boom tube, while Wonder Woman decapitates the airborne Steppenwolf before his body arrives at Darkseid's feet on Apokolips through the portal.

In the aftermath of the battle, Wayne re-acquires the Kent farm for Martha before it can be foreclosed. Superman resumes his life as Kent and as protector of Earth.

Later years 

In 2018, Superman makes a visit to Freddy Freeman and Shazam at their school cafeteria, as a favor to Billy for Freddy.  In 2021, Superman is shot with a kryptonite bullet by mercenary Robert DuBois / Bloodsport and placed in the ICU. However, he manages to survive, and DuBois is incarcerated before being recruited by Amanda Waller for Task Force X in exchange for a reduced prison sentence.  In 2022, he and the Justice League, with the exception of Batman and Cyborg, are called by Waller to assist Christopher Smith / Peacemaker in facing the Butterfly army but arrive too late, missing the fight. Later that same year, Superman is once again called by Waller to confront the new leader of Kahndaq, Black Adam. Superman approaches Black Adam and says that the two of them need to talk.

Alternate versions

Steppenwolf victorious 

Zack Snyder's Justice League depicts a moment when the Mother Boxes converge and the Justice League are too late to stop Steppenwolf from calling Darkseid and his army. Superman, alongside the rest of the Justice League, is killed at ground zero of the event. This version of events is erased when Barry Allen enters the Speed Force and reverses time.

Knightmare reality 

Victor Stone and Bruce Wayne see premonitions of a "Knightmare" reality. Victor sees Darkseid's campaign of death upon returning to Earth, ultimately killing Lois Lane. This leaves a devastated Superman susceptible to the Anti-Life Equation, becoming Darkseid's second-in-command. One of Wayne's premonitions saw Superman leading a Regime allied with Parademons who capture Batman & members of his insurgency, leaving them to be tortured and killed by Superman himself. Wayne's other premonition shows Superman tracking down Batman, The Joker, Deathstroke, Mera, Victor Stone & Barry Allen.

In other media

Video games 

 The Man of Steel depiction of Superman is featured as a skin in the 2013 video game Injustice: Gods Among Us.
 Clark's Justice League costume is able to be downloaded as a skin in the 2018 Video Game Lego DC Super-Villains.
 Superman appears alongside the rest of the Justice League in the virtual reality video game Justice League VR: The Complete Experience.
 The DC Extended Universe version of Superman is a playable character in the mobile game version of Injustice 2. The chest emblem is also an unlockable costume addition.

Literature 

 Superman appears and is mentioned in the novelizations of the films set within the DC Extended Universe.
 Superman makes a cameo appearance at the end of the Man of Steel prequel comic written to tie in to the film. The comic delves more into the history of Krypton and his distant ancestor and cousin Kara Zor-El.

Jimmy Kimmel Live! 
 Cavill, along with Ben Affleck and Jesse Eisenberg, reprised their roles in a "deleted scene" of Batman v Superman: Dawn of Justice featuring Affleck's longtime friend Jimmy Kimmel shown on Jimmy Kimmel Live!. In the skit, Kimmel's character successfully deduces the superhero identities of both Clark Kent and Bruce Wayne at Lex Luthor's gala, resulting in Clark Kent throwing Kimmel's character to Mars in annoyance, where he encounters Matt Damon's character from The Martian.

Reception 
Cavill's performance as Superman has received polarized reviews from critics. While Cavill's portrayal of Clark Kent's inner turmoil and chemistry with co-star Amy Adams was praised, other critics commented on perceived stiffness and a lack of charisma in Man of Steel. These critical assessments proved to carry over to the film's sequel Batman v Superman: Dawn of Justice. In a positive review of the film, Richard Corliss wrote, "The movie finds its true, lofty footing not when it displays Kal-El's extraordinary powers, but when it dramatizes Clark Kent's roiling humanity. The super part of Man of Steel is just okay, but the man part is super."

Particularly criticized was Superman's decision to kill General Zod during the climax of Man of Steel. Artist Neal Adams suggested that other alternatives were open to Superman when Zod threatened innocent people with his heat vision, such as covering his eyes. He also criticized Superman for not moving the battle away from Metropolis as Christopher Reeve's version of the character did at the end of Superman II, causing extensive collateral damage to the city. However, Adam Holmes of CinemaBlend counters that Clark is still inexperienced as a superhero in Man of Steel, learning from his mistakes by Batman v Superman, in which he successfully drives Doomsday to space.

In the theatrical release of Justice League, viewers noted that Superman became more hopeful and optimistic and more in line with Reeve's portrayal of the character, but that his change of character was abrupt and unexplained, among many inconsistencies in the film caused by the sudden handover of directorial duties from Zack Snyder to Joss Whedon. In addition, his digitally removed mustache, which was poorly executed, was the subject of ridicule.

Contrarily, critics praised Superman's character arc in the "Snyder Cut" as being more natural, with some claiming that the best scenes in the movie involved Henry Cavill. Tom Jergensen from IGN wrote "His reunion with Lois Lane (Amy Adams) and Martha Kent (Diane Lane) is much more emotional thanks to Snyder’s increased focus on how devastated the two were by his death. However, one way in which Snyder’s cut doesn’t vary much from the theatrical cut in conception is that Superman’s role is limited by design; but here at least, he’s far more prevalent as a symbol for our heroes."

Leading up to the release of the 2021 Marvel Cinematic Universe film Eternals, director Chloé Zhao stated that her interpretation of the character Ikaris in the film was heavily inspired by Superman as portrayed in Snyder's DCEU films, especially for Snyder's "authentic and very real" approach in Man of Steel, which "left a strong impression" on Zhao.

Notes

See also 
Superman (franchise)
Superman (1978 film series character)
Clark Kent (Superman & Lois)
Characters of the DC Extended Universe

References 

 The plot description and characterization were adapted from Superman, Man of Steel and Batman v. Superman: Dawn of Justice at the DC Extended Universe Wiki, which are available under a Creative Commons Attribution-Share Alike 3.0 (Unported) (CC-BY-SA 3.0) license.

External links 

Alternative versions of Superman
Characters created by Christopher Nolan
Characters created by Zack Snyder
Christ figures in fiction
DC Comics American superheroes
DC Comics characters who can move at superhuman speeds
DC Comics characters with accelerated healing
DC Comics characters with superhuman strength
DC Comics extraterrestrial superheroes
DC Extended Universe characters
Fictional characters from Kansas
Fictional characters with X-ray vision
Fictional characters with superhuman durability or invulnerability
Fictional characters with superhuman senses
Fictional characters with nuclear or radiation abilities
Fictional characters with air or wind abilities
Fictional characters with ice or cold abilities
Fictional characters with absorption or parasitic abilities
Fictional characters with energy-manipulation abilities
Fictional characters with fire or heat abilities
Fictional characters with post-traumatic stress disorder
Fictional refugees
Fictional reporters
Film characters introduced in 2013
Kryptonians
Male superheroes
Orphan characters in film
Resurrection in film
Superheroes with alter egos
Superman in other media